Mikhail Anatolyevich Rusyayev (15 November 1964 – 10 April 2011) was a Russian professional footballer who played as a striker.

Early life 
Rusyayev was born in Chaakhol, Tuva and raised in Tos-Bulak.

Career 
He made his debut in the Soviet Top League in 1982 for FC Spartak Moscow. He played 126 professional games in Germany.

Personal life 
In 2005, Rusyayev suffered a stroke which left half of his body paralysed.

He died on 10 April 2011 in Moscow following complications from his stroke.

Honours 
 Soviet Top League champion: 1987; runner-up 1983, 1984, 1985; bronze 1982, 1986
 Soviet Cup finalist: 1990
 Russian Premier League champion: 1992

References

External links 
 

1964 births
2011 deaths
People from Tuva
Soviet footballers
Russian footballers
Association football forwards
FC Spartak Moscow players
FC Lokomotiv Moscow players
Alemannia Aachen players
VfB Oldenburg players
Tennis Borussia Berlin players
FC Carl Zeiss Jena players
Soviet Top League players
Russian Premier League players
2. Bundesliga players
Soviet expatriate footballers
Russian expatriate footballers
Russian expatriate sportspeople in Germany
Expatriate footballers in Germany